Simone Tascone (born 18 December 1997) is an Italian football player. He plays for  club Virtus Entella.

Club career
He made his Serie B debut for Ternana on 20 May 2016 in a game against Brescia.

On 25 July 2018, he joined Fano for the 2018–19 season on loan from Pescara, whom he signed for one day before.

On 19 August 2019, he joined Catanzaro on loan. On 31 January 2020, he moved on a new loan to Casertana.

On 18 August 2020 he moved to Picerno. On 29 September 2020, before he could play any games for Picerno, he moved again, signing a two-year contract with Turris.

On 19 July 2022, Tascone signed with Virtus Entella.

References

External links
 

1997 births
Footballers from Naples
Living people
Italian footballers
Paganese Calcio 1926 players
Alma Juventus Fano 1906 players
U.S. Catanzaro 1929 players
Casertana F.C. players
Virtus Entella players
Serie B players
Serie C players
Serie D players
Association football midfielders